In Riemannian or pseudo Riemannian geometry (in particular the Lorentzian geometry of general relativity), the Levi-Civita connection is the unique affine connection on the tangent bundle of a manifold (i.e. affine connection) that preserves the (pseudo-)Riemannian metric and is torsion-free.

The fundamental theorem of Riemannian geometry states that there is a unique connection which satisfies these properties.

In the theory of Riemannian and pseudo-Riemannian manifolds the term covariant derivative is often used for the Levi-Civita connection. The components (structure coefficients) of this connection with respect to a system of local coordinates are called Christoffel symbols.

History
The Levi-Civita connection is named after Tullio Levi-Civita, although originally "discovered" by Elwin Bruno Christoffel. Levi-Civita, along with Gregorio Ricci-Curbastro, used Christoffel's symbols to define the notion of parallel transport and explore the relationship of parallel transport with the curvature, thus developing the modern notion of holonomy.

In 1869, Christoffel discovered that the components of the intrinsic derivative of a vector field, upon changing the coordinate system, transform as the components of a contravariant vector. This discovery was the real beginning of tensor analysis. 

In 1906, L. E. J. Brouwer was the first mathematician to consider the parallel transport of a vector for the case of 
a space of constant curvature.

In 1917, Levi-Civita pointed out its importance for the case of a hypersurface immersed in a Euclidean space, i.e., for the case of a Riemannian manifold embedded in a "larger" ambient space. He interpreted the intrinsic derivative in the case of an embedded surface as the tangential component of the usual derivative in the ambient affine space. The Levi-Civita notions of intrinsic derivative and parallel displacement of a vector along a curve make sense on an abstract Riemannian manifold, even though the original motivation relied on a specific embedding 

In 1918, independently of Levi-Civita, Jan Arnoldus Schouten obtained analogous results. In the same year, Hermann Weyl generalized 
Levi-Civita's results.

Notation
 denotes a Riemannian or pseudo-Riemannian manifold.
It is again a smooth vector field.

The metric  can take up to two vectors or vector fields  as arguments. Vector fields act (by definition) as differential operators on smooth functions. In local coordinates , the action reads

where Einstein's summation convention is used.

Formal definition
An affine connection  is called a Levi-Civita connection if

 it preserves the metric, i.e., .

Condition 1 above is sometimes referred to as compatibility with the metric, and condition 2 is sometimes called symmetry, cf. Do Carmo's text.

Fundamental theorem of (pseudo) Riemannian Geometry

Theorem Every pseudo Riemannian manifold  has a unique Levi Civita connection .

proof:
If a Levi-Civita connection exists, it must be unique. To see this, unravel the definition of the action of 
a connection on tensors to find 

Hence we can write condition 1 as 
 
By the symmetry of the metric tensor  we then find:

By condition 2, the right hand side is therefore equal to

and we find the Koszul formula

By substituting the Koszul formula, one now checks that for all vector fields , and all functions 

Hence the Koszul expression does, in fact, define a connection, and this connection is compatible with the metric and is torsion free, i.e. is a (hence the) Levi-Civita connection.

Note that with minor variations the same proof shows that there is a unique connection that is compatible with the metric and has prescribed torsion.

Christoffel symbols
Let  be an affine connection on the tangent bundle.

The Christoffel symbols conversely define the connection  on the coordinate neighbourhood because

that is,

An affine connection  is compatible with a metric iff

i.e., if and only if

An affine connection  is torsion free iff

i.e., if and only if 

is symmetric in its lower two indices.

where as usual  are the coefficients of the dual metric tensor, i.e. the entries of the inverse of the matrix .

Derivative along curve

Formally,  is the pullback connection  on the pullback bundle .

In particular,  is a vector field along the curve  itself. If  vanishes, the curve is called a geodesic of the covariant derivative. Formally, the condition can be restated as the vanishing of the pullback connection applied to :

If the covariant derivative is the Levi-Civita connection of a certain metric, then the geodesics for the connection are precisely those geodesics of the metric that are parametrised proportionally to their arc length.

Parallel transport
In general, parallel transport along a curve with respect to a connection defines isomorphisms between the tangent spaces at the points of the curve. If the connection is a Levi-Civita connection, then these isomorphisms are orthogonal – that is, they preserve the inner products on the various tangent spaces.

The images below show parallel transport of the Levi-Civita connection associated to two different Riemannian metrics on the plane, expressed in polar coordinates. The metric of left image corresponds to the standard Euclidean metric , while the metric on the right has standard form in polar coordinates (when ), and thus preserves the vector  tangent to the circle. This second metric has a singularity at the origin, as can be seen by expressing it in Cartesian coordinates:

Example: the unit sphere in 
It follows that a vector field  on  can be seen as a map , which satisfies

Denote as  the covariant derivative of the map  in the direction of the vector . Then we have:

Indeed, one can check that this connection preserves the metric.

See also
 Weitzenböck connection

Notes

References
 
  See Volume I pag. 158

External links
 
 MathWorld: Levi-Civita Connection
 PlanetMath: Levi-Civita Connection
 Levi-Civita connection at the Manifold Atlas

Riemannian geometry
Connection (mathematics)